Blue Skies is the debut album by American Idol runner-up Diana DeGarmo, released in December 7, 2004 on RCA Records. It debuted at number 52, selling 47,000 copies in its first week and currently 168,000 copies.

Track listing

Song cover versions
"The Difference in Me" and "Then I Woke Up" were covered by Clique Girlz for their album, Incredible.
"Dream, Dream, Dream" was covered by Miley Cyrus for the Hannah Montana: The Movie soundtrack.
"The Difference in Me" and "Boy Like You" were covered in Spanish by Nikki Clan for their debut album, as "Corazón abierto" and "No me digas que no" respectively.

Diana DeGarmo albums
RCA Records albums
2004 debut albums
Albums produced by David Foster
Albums produced by John Shanks
Albums produced by Clive Davis
19 Recordings albums